Cyana margarethae is a moth of the family Erebidae. It was described by Sergius G. Kiriakoff in 1958. It is found in Kenya and Uganda.

References

Cyana
Moths described in 1958
Moths of Africa